National Football League Cup is a Russian football competition, held among the best teams of Russian Football National League in the winter break.

History
The first cup was held in 2012. On 1 December 2011, it was reported that the cup rules were approved. According to those rules, the teams are divided into two groups. In 2015 FNL Cup the clubs was divided into four groups.

It is not mandatory for FNL clubs to participate, and in cases when some do refuse to, Russian Professional Football League or Russian Premier League teams are invited to fill the spots. In the 2016 edition, FC Volgar Astrakhan fielded two squads.

Winners

2020 final ranking

* In the final match, FC Tambov did not play in the main team (the main squad of FC Tambov left the tournament early).

** FC Shinnik Yaroslavl was awarded walkover in match for 3rd place (FC KAMAZ left the tournament early).

Performance by club

References

Russia
Football cup competitions in Russia
Recurring sporting events established in 2012
2012 establishments in Russia